Jack Richardson may refer to:

Jack Richardson (actor) (1870–1960), American silent film actor
Jack Richardson (baseball) (1892–1970), American pitcher
Jack Richardson (chemical engineer) (1920–2011), British academic best known as a textbook author
Jack Richardson (footballer, born 1886) (1886–1965), Australian rules footballer
Jack Richardson (footballer, born 1906) (1906–1993), Australian rules footballer
Jack Richardson (politician) (1921–2011), Australian politician
Jack Richardson (record producer) (1929–2011), Canadian record producer
Jack Richardson (writer) (1934–2012), American playwright

See also
Jonathan Richardson (disambiguation)
John Richardson (disambiguation)